The 14556 / 55 Bareilly–Delhi Express is an Express train belonging to Indian Railways – Northern Railway zone that runs between  &  in India.

It operates as train number 14556 from Delhi to Bareilly and as train number 14555 in the reverse direction, serving the states of Uttar Pradesh & Delhi.

Coaches

The 14556 / 55 Bareilly–Delhi Express has 1 AC 2 tier, 2 AC 3 tier, 3 Sleeper class, 7 General Unreserved & 2 SLR (Seating cum Luggage Rake) coaches. It does not carry a pantry car.
 
As is customary with most train services in India, coach composition may be amended at the discretion of Indian Railways depending on demand.

Service

As the average speed of the train is below , as per Indian Railways rules, its fare does not include a Superfast surcharge.

Routeing

Traction

As large sections of the route are yet to be fully electrified, a Tughlakabad-based WDP-3A locomotive powers the train for its entire journey.

References

External links

Trains from Bareilly
Transport in Delhi
Express trains in India
Rail transport in Delhi